Glan-yr-afon, Glanyrafon and Glanrafon may refer to:
 Glan-yr-afon, Bodffordd, Anglesey, Wales
 Glan-yr-afon, Llangoed, Anglesey, Wales
 Glanyrafon, Ceredigion, Wales
 Glanyrafon railway station
 Glan-yr-afon, Flintshire, Wales
 Glan-yr-afon, Gwynedd, Wales
 Glan-yr-Afon Halt railway station (former), Powys, Wales
 Glan-yr-afon, Shropshire, England
 Glanyrafon Halt railway station (former)
 Riverside, Cardiff, Wales

See also
 Glanafon, Pembrokeshire, Wales